Tajín is a Mexican company founded in 1985 by Horacio Fernández that produces several varieties of condiment, consisting predominantly of chili peppers, lime, and salt. The company, officially called Empresas Tajín, is located in Zapopan, Jalisco, Mexico.

History
The product now called Tajín was created by Fernández's grandmother, "Mama Necha", as a sauce. Fernández wanted to recreate the sauce in powder form so he could market it, and was intent on developing a process to dehydrate the chilis and limes. After visiting the pre-Columbian archaeological site El Tajín in the state of Veracruz, Fernández decided to name his product after it. Tajín entered the U.S. market in 1993.

Products
Tajín Clásico seasoning, the company's most popular product, is a seasoning powder, often referred to as simply Tajín, consisting of ground chili peppers, sea salt, and dehydrated lime juice. The powder is tangy and spicy, and has a color ranging from amber to carmine. It is often added to food, especially fruit, as a condiment. Tajín is also used occasionally as an ingredient in micheladas, a beer cocktail, or to rim a margarita.

Empresas Tajín also produces  salsa, such as the Tajín Mild Hot Sauce, which is  similar to the powdered seasoning Tajín Clásico in a liquid blend.

Gallery

See also 
 
 List of culinary herbs and spices

References

Mexican cuisine
Herb and spice mixtures
Brand name condiments
Mexican brands